Sabahudin "Dino" Bilalović (7 May 1960 – 29 July 2003) was a  Bosnian professional basketball player.

About 
He was born in Trebinje, Bosnia and Herzegovina.

In 1979, as a player of KK Bosna Sarajevo, in his early career years, he won the Euroleague at the time European Champions Cup.

National team career 
He made the national team of Yugoslavia in the early nineties for the 1990 Goodwill Games, the second games which took place in Seattle, United States, along with Dražen Petrović, Toni Kukoč, Žarko Paspalj, Dino Rađa other great stars of Yugoslavian basketball.

Later, in the first appearance of Bosnia and Herzegovina national basketball team, in EuroBasket 1993, he was the Top Scorer of the tournament averaging 25 (24.6) points per game:
 vs. Latvia he scored 36 points,
 vs. Estonia he scored 29 points,
 vs. Croatia he scored 28 points,
 vs. Sweden he scored 26 points.
 vs. Italy he scored 22 points.
 vs. Russia he scored 21 points.
 vs. Spain he scored 18 points.
 vs. Greece he scored 17 points.

Personal life 
Bilalović's mother Ševka Bajraktarević (1934 – 30 September 2013) was the older sister of Silvana Armenulić, famous folk singer in Yugoslavia. Her other sisters Mirjana Bajraktarević and Dina Bajraktarević also maintained folk singing careers of their own.

Death 
Bilalović died July 2003 during his vacation to the Croatian coastal town of Makarska from previously diagnosed heart condition. He died of a heart attack on the beach while swimming with his son.

References

1960 births
2003 deaths
Yugoslav men's basketball players
Bosnia and Herzegovina men's basketball players
Bosnia and Herzegovina expatriate basketball people in Switzerland
Bosnia and Herzegovina expatriate basketball people in Germany
Bosnia and Herzegovina expatriate basketball people in Spain
Bosnia and Herzegovina expatriate basketball people in Israel
CB Breogán players
Centers (basketball)
KK Vojvodina players
KK Zagreb players
Liga ACB players
Lugano Tigers players
People from Trebinje
Bosnia and Herzegovina Muslims
Competitors at the 1990 Goodwill Games
Disease-related deaths in Croatia